Metsu is a surname. Notable people with the surname include:

Gabriël Metsu (1629–1667), Dutch painter
Bruno Metsu (1954–2013), French footballer
Koen Metsu (born 1981), Belgian politician